Snapshot is a live album by the American band Mission of Burma. It was recorded in front of a small audience at Boston's Q Division Studios for broadcast on WFNX. It was initially released exclusively through the iTunes Store, but has since been made available through other online channels, most notably in lossless FLAC format through Matador Records' online store.

Track listing
 "Tremolo" (Clint Conley) – 8:06
 "Mica" (Holly Anderson and Conley) – 4:24
 "Youth of America" (Greg Sage) – 6:41
 "Absent Mind" (Peter Prescott) – 1:53
 "Red" (Roger Miller) – 4:25
 "That's How I Escaped My Certain Fate" (Conley) – 2:32
 "Max Ernst" (Miller) – 3:10
 "Dirt" (Conley) – 5:13

Personnel
 Clint Conley – bass, vocals, percussion
 Roger Miller – guitar, vocals, percussion
 Peter Prescott – drums, vocals, percussion
 Bob Weston – loops, percussion

Reception
David Raposa of Pitchfork said it was worthy of a "wider commercial release" and awarded it 8.2/10. Music critic Mark Prindle gave the album 8/10 and praised the mix of the album.

References

Mission of Burma albums
2004 live albums
Matador Records live albums